Miss Model of the World is an international model contest organized for the first time in Istanbul, Turkey, in 1988 with 42 countries participating.

Recent titleholders
Source:

List of runners-up

Continental Models

See also
 List of beauty pageants

References

Further reading

External links
 

 
International beauty pageants